McCutcheon v David MacBrayne Ltd [1964] 1 WLR 125 is a Scottish contract law case, concerning the incorporation of a term through a course of dealings.

Facts
On 8 October 1960, MV Lochiel (1939), David MacBrayne Ltd's ferry struck rocks and sank, losing Mr McCutcheon's car en route between Islay and the mainland. Usually, David MacBrayne Ltd would have got its customers to sign a risk note. The claimant's brother in law (Mr McSporran) had made the shipping arrangements, and he did not sign it. Mr McCutcheon had signed a risk note on four occasions and Mr McSporran had done so sometimes before too. Both said they knew notes contained conditions but not what the conditions were. David MacBrayne Ltd argued that even though it was not signed, the term letting Mr McCutcheon assume the risk of an accident had been incorporated into their contract through a course of dealing.

Judgment
The House of Lords held, reversing the decision of the Court of Session, that there was no regular course of dealing with McCutcheon and no consistent course of dealing with McSporran, and therefore David MacBrayne Ltd could not say that its term shifting the risk of an accident had been incorporated. Lord Reid explained that the term could not be incorporated through reasonable notice or a signature on this occasion alone, and went on.

Lord Devlin came to the same conclusion but wished to impose a higher test. According to him actual knowledge would be necessary to incorporate terms.

Lord Pearce held that the course of dealings was not consistent, because previously risk notes were signed. A course of dealing must be regular and consistent.

See also

English contract law
Henry Kendall Ltd v William Lillico Ltd [1969] 2 AC 31, rejected Lord Devlin's dictum that actual knowledge was necessary to prove before a term is incorporated

Notes

References

English contract case law
House of Lords cases
1964 in case law
1964 in British law
David MacBrayne